Biologiska museet is a museum located in Djurgården in Stockholm. It exhibits a collection of stuffed European birds and mammals  in dioramas. Some of the diorama backgrounds were created by artist Bruno Liljefors, known for his dramatic paintings of Scandinavian wildlife. The museum was built in 1893
after a design by architect Agi Lindegren who was inspired by medieval Norwegian stave churches.

Gallery, building

Gallery, interior

See also 
 Museums in Stockholm

References

External links

Official homepage (Swedish and English)

Museums in Stockholm
Natural history museums in Sweden